Escherichia coli O121 is a pathogenic serotype of Escherichia coli, associated with
Shiga toxin, intestinal bleeding, and hemolytic-uremic syndrome (HUS). HUS, if left untreated, can lead to kidney failure.

Most serotypes of E. coli—a widespread species of bacteria residing in the lower intestines of mammals—are beneficial or do not cause disease. Unlike other pathogenic serotypes, such as E. coli O157:H7 (also an enterohemorrhagic E. coli), little is known in detail about the public health significance of O121. Therefore, O121 is sometimes roughly classified as a type of “non-O157 Shiga toxin–producing E. coli” (non-O157 STEC).

A U.S. outbreak of E. coli O121 in 2013 sickened 24 people in 15 states according to a statement released by the CDC. New York officials found the bacterium strain in an open package of Farm Rich brand chicken quesadillas from an ill person’s home; parent company Rich Products Corp. of Buffalo, New York is now recalling these and several other items and the CDC, USDA, and FDA are now investigating to find the precise source of the outbreak.

In 2016, General Mills recalled 10 million pounds of wheat flour tied to an E. coli O121 outbreak.

See also
 Escherichia coli O157:H7

References

Escherichia coli